Communist Workers League is the name of several organisations:

 Communist Workers League (Norway)
 Communist Workers League (Senegal)
 Communist Workers League (Spain)
 Communist Workers League (Sweden)

See also
 Workers Communist League (disambiguation)